Theraphosa apophysis is a species of spider in the family Theraphosidae, found in Venezuela and Brazil.

Description
Theraphosa apophysis generally resembles Theraphosa blondi, and reaches a similar size. Young T. apophysis spiders have pink shading at the end of each leg, which fades with each moult. T. apophysis has an additional stridulating organ on the coxa of the second leg and thinner femora than T. blondi. The male T. apophysis has tibial apophyses (projections) – hence the species name. The ground colour of both sexes is coffee brown; the legs and opisthosoma have long scattered orange-brown hairs, with long orange hair on the femora. Mature males have a metallic sheen, described as "wine red" in colour, on the cephalothorax, the dorsal surface of the chelicerae, the pedipalps, and the coxa, trochanter and femur of the legs, as well as the patella of the first leg.

Taxonomy
The species was first described by Andreas Tinter in 1991, as Pseudotheraphosa apophysis. Tinter purchased an individual under the name "Pamphobeteus exsul", but realized that it could not be correctly named, as it possessed stridulatory organs. After further investigation, he named it as a new species in a new genus, Pseudotheraphosa. In 2001, based on a phylogenetic analysis, Rogério Bertani rejected this genus and placed the species in Theraphosa, a view followed since by other workers.

In captivity
Theraphosa apophysis is considered to be a difficult tarantula to care for and maintain, and is therefore not recommended for beginners. This is due to their nervous and defensive disposition, as well as high humidity requirements. However, their large size, food-aggressiveness, and fast growth rate makes then desirable for more experienced keepers.

References

Spiders of South America
Theraphosidae
Spiders described in 1991